St. John's Church in Helsinki, Finland is a Lutheran church designed by the Swedish architect  in the Gothic Revival style. It is the largest stone church in Finland by seating capacity.

Description
Johannes (John) church stands on a hill that for many centuries had been a place for Midsummer bonfires (Midsummer is now also "John's Day", Juhannus in Finnish).

Situated in the Ullanlinna district of Helsinki, the church was built between 1888 and 1891, the third Lutheran church in Helsinki, and still the biggest. The altarpiece shows Saul's conversion and the painting, called A Divine Revelation, is by Eero Järnefelt, brother-in-law to Jean Sibelius.

In August 2022, a six-month renovation of the church was completed, in which the gargoyles of the church were repaired and renewed due to their poor condition; Helsinki's raw sea air and weather fluctuations on both sides of zero had worn out the condition of the concrete decorations and it was feared that they would crumble and fall in time.

Organ
The organ was built in 1891 by German company Walcker of Ludwigsburg, with a pneumatic mechanism. At the time it was the largest in the country. In 1921 composer Oskar Merikanto, the first church organist, expanded the organ. In 2004 and 2005 the organ was renovated by German organ builder Christian Scheffler Orgelwerkstatt; it now has 66 voices and 4036 whistles.

In 2018 an English-style shell organ, by Urkurakentamo Veikko Virtanen Oy from Espoo, was installed. It has nine voices and a movable soundboard.

Gallery

See also
 Evangelical Lutheran Church of Finland

References

External links

  St. John's Church at the Parish Union of Helsinki official website (English translation)

Lutheran churches in Helsinki
Brick Gothic
Churches completed in 1891
19th-century Lutheran churches
Gothic Revival church buildings in Finland
19th-century churches in Finland